See You All In Hell is the sixth extended play by the post-hardcore band Funeral for a Friend. It was released on 7 November 2011 by Distiller Records in the United Kingdom. The first track, "High Castles", was released as a digital single on 13 October 2011. By 15 November 2011, the album had received mixed to positive reception with Kerrang! giving the album a "Good" three out of five rating.

Release and promotion
The band's opinion on the release of the extended play was, “We wanted to release something special as an add-on to Welcome Home Armageddon." The release is considered a "tie in" with the release of Welcome Home Armageddon on vinyl. The EP was announced on 28 September 2011, Funeral for a Friend saying that it would have only one brand new track while the remainder of the tracks were acoustic renditions, live session recordings and remixes of tracks from Welcome Home Armageddon as well as a coverversion of the hardcore punk band Strife. The release of the EP was accompanied by a UK tour by the band in October 2011 as well as a digital single of "High Castles" on 13 October 2011.

Reception

The EP received positive responses from critics. Kerrang!s writer, Alistair Lawrence, gave the album a three 'K' out of five, indicating a "Good" rating, and praised the combination of acoustic songs, a remix and a cover to prove they were still "brimming with enthusiasm and the seeds of new ideas". Chris Jefferies in an otherwise positive review of the record for Virgin Music criticised Matt Davies' vocals on the final two acoustic songs writing, "There's no question that the frontman still has the range to pull off these songs, but without the full band backing, his vocals sound strained and completely lacking of the warmth that made earlier Funeral For A Friend records so touching."

Track listing

Personnel
Matthew Davies-Kreye – lead vocals
Kris Coombs-Roberts – guitar
Gavin Burrough – guitar, backing vocals
Richard Boucher – bass guitar
Ryan Richards – drums, aggressive vocals
Romesh Dodangoda - producer

References

Funeral for a Friend albums
2011 EPs
Albums produced by Romesh Dodangoda